Edward J. Hughes Jr. is an American politician who served in the New Jersey Senate from 1972 to 1978.

In the June 1977 Democratic primary, Assemblyman Charles B. Yates knocked off Hughes in his bid for re-election and went on to win the Senate seat in the general election.

References

Living people
Democratic Party New Jersey state senators
Year of birth missing (living people)
People from Cinnaminson Township, New Jersey
Politicians from Burlington County, New Jersey